Kaavvijjuaq (Inuktitut syllabics: ᑳᕝᕕᔾᔪᐊᖅ) formerly Lee Island is an uninhabited island located in the Qikiqtaaluk Region, Nunavut, Canada. It is a Baffin Island offshore island in Hudson Strait, and a member of the Sheer Islands, along with Qaqqannalik, Lavoie Island, and Wishart Island.

References

Islands of Baffin Island
Islands of Hudson Strait
Uninhabited islands of Qikiqtaaluk Region